Neil Davids (22 September 1955 – 23 December 2011) was an English professional footballer who played as a defender.

Born in Bingley, Bradford, Davids started his career Leeds United, and represented England at youth level. He signed professional terms with the club in August 1973, but left the club two years later without making a single first-team appearance. After a brief spell at Norwich City, Davids joined Swansea City in July 1977, where he featured in the club's promotion-winning campaign from the Fourth Division. He moved to Wigan Athletic in 1978, and played in the club's first ever Football League fixture against Hereford United. He also became the club's first Football League player to be substituted.

References

External links

1955 births
People from Bingley
English footballers
Association football defenders
English Football League players
Leeds United F.C. players
Norwich City F.C. players
Northampton Town F.C. players
Stockport County F.C. players
Swansea City A.F.C. players
Wigan Athletic F.C. players
2011 deaths
Sportspeople from Yorkshire